K-Scope is the second studio album by Phil Manzanera.

History 

The album was re-released in 1991 featuring three bonus tracks. In 2011 American hip hop artists Kanye West and Jay Z sampled the opening guitar riff from "K-Scope" for their song "No Church in the Wild" in their first collaborative album Watch the Throne (2011). In 2015 Manzanera covered their track for his album The Sound of Blue.

Track listing
All tracks composed by Phil Manzanera; except where indicated

Personnel 
Many of the same personnel had appeared as part of the 1977 801 album Listen Now.

 Phil Manzanera  – Farfisa organ, guitar, keyboards, electric piano, lead vocals, Yamaha CS80 synthesizer
 Simon Phillips – drums, electronic percussion
 Paul Thompson – drums
 Bill MacCormick  – bass, drums, backing vocals
 Simon Ainley  – lead vocals, rhythm guitar
 Dave Skinner  – Yamaha electric piano, keyboards, lead vocals
 Eddie Rayner  – keyboards, Moog bass, Yamaha electric piano, upright piano, Yamaha CS80 synthesizer
 Tim Finn  – lead vocals
 Neil Finn  – backing vocals
 Mel Collins  – saxophone
 Lol Creme  – Gizmo effects, lead & backing vocals
 Kevin Godley - backing vocals and hi-hat on "Hot Spot"
 John Wetton – bass, lead vocals, percussion, voices
 Francis Monkham - piano on "N-Shift"
Technical
Gregg Jackman, Melvyn Abrahams - engineer
Chris Cooper - cover concept

Charts

References 

1978 albums
Island Records albums
E.G. Records albums
Phil Manzanera albums
Albums produced by Phil Manzanera